Dr. T. Thimmaiah Institute of Technology (Dr.TTIT) is a college in Kolar Gold Fields, Karnataka, India, under the VTU Visvesvaraya Technological University recognized by the Government of Karnataka and approved by the All India Council of Technical Education AICTE, New Delhi.
Formerly Known as Golden Valley Institute of Technology.

The college
The college provides professional education in engineering streams such as Computer science, Electrical & Electronics, Mechanical, Mining and Civil.

Campus and location
The campus is set in a  area. The campus has facilities like library and WiFi. The college has "The UFO" outlet where all varieties of food is available for the students at greater standards.

Admission procedure and eligibility
Students are admitted on merit, according to the directives of the Government of Karnataka, both to the Government Quota and the Management Quota.

Eligibility for admission to B.E. courses is a pass in 10+2 class or equivalent with a minimum 45% in Science group. Mathematics and Physics are compulsory Science subjects. Any other Science subjects like Chemistry can be the Third Science subjects.

Undergraduate programs
 Mechanical Engineering 
 Mining Engineering 
 Computer Science and Engineering
 Electronics and Communication Engineering
 Electrical and Electronics Engineering
 Civil Engineering

Postgraduate Programs
Machine Design
Digital Communications and Networking

References

All India Council for Technical Education
Affiliates of Visvesvaraya Technological University
Engineering colleges in Karnataka
Universities and colleges in Kolar district